Dolicholatirus is a genus of sea snails, marine gastropod mollusks in the subfamily Peristerniinae of the family Fasciolariidae, the spindle snails, the tulip snails and their allies.

Species
Species within the genus Dolicholatirus include:

 Dolicholatirus acus (Adams & Reeve, 1848)
  Dolicholatirus bairstowi (G.B. Sowerby III, 1886)
 Dolicholatirus bozzetti Lussi, 1993
 Dolicholatirus brevicaudatus Lussi, 2014
 † Dolicholatirus bronni (Michelotti, 1847) 
 Dolicholatirus cayohuesonicus (G.B. Sowerby II, 1878) 
 Dolicholatirus celinamarumai Kosuge, 1981
 Dolicholatirus fernandesi Bozzetti, 2002
 Dolicholatirus lancea (Gmelin, 1791) 
 Dolicholatirus maryseae D. Monsecour & Lorenz, 2018
 Dolicholatirus minusculus Bozzetti, 2007
 Dolicholatirus mosterti Lussi, 2014
 Dolicholatirus pauli (McGinty, 1955)
 Dolicholatirus smithi Snyder, 2000
 Dolicholatirus spiceri (Tenison-Woods, 1876)
 † Dolicholatirus teschi (Finlay, 1927) 
 Dolicholatirus thesaurus (Garrard, 1963)
 Dolicholatirus vezzaroi Cossignani, 2015
Species brought into synonymy
 Dolicholatirus duffyi Petuch, 1992: synonym of Teralatirus funebris (Preston, 1907)
 Dolicholatirus funebris (Preston, 1907): synonym of Teralatirus funebris (Preston, 1907)
 † Dolicholatirus ornatus P. Marshall, 1918: synonym of † Latirogona ornata (P. Marshall, 1918)

References

External links
 Bellardi L. (1884). I molluschi dei terreni terziarii del Piemonte e della Liguria. Parte IV (Fasciolaridae e Turbinellidae). Preprint, Ermanno Loescher, Torino, 62 pp. Also published in 1886 with identical contents as Memorie della Reale Accademia delle Scienze di Torino, ser. 2, 37: 2-62, 2 pls
 Snyder, M.A. (2003) Catalogue of the marine gastropod family Fasciolariidae. Academy of Natural Sciences of Philadelphia, Special Publication, 21, iii + 1–431.

Fasciolariidae